Hasora leucospila is a butterfly belonging to the family Hesperiidae which is found in Southeast Asia, Cambodia.

See also 
 Coeliadinae
 Hesperiidae

Hasora
Butterflies described in 1891
Butterflies of Asia